Otto "Schloime" Fischer (1 January 1901 – 1 July 1941) was a former Austrian football player who played left winger, and coached. He made 7 appearances for the Austria national football team. He was killed in the Liepāja massacres in Latvia during the Holocaust in Latvia.

Player career
He was born in Austrian capital Vienna, back then capital of Austro-Hungary, and was Jewish. His parents were Heinrich Fischer, born in 1860 in Gewitch, Moravia (now Jevíčko, Czech Republic), and Netti Fischer (née Pokorny) born in 1870 in Betley (or Bettlern), Moravia.

Fischer played with ASV Hertha Wien in the Austrian National League and Karlsbader FK. He then played six consecutive seasons in the Austrian championship, first as left forward with First Vienna FC (3 seasons, 1923 till 1926), then with Hakoah Vienna (3 seasons, 1926 till 1930) and including a spell with Wacker Wien (half season of 1927–28).

Between 1923 and 1928 he made 7 appearances for the Austria national football team. A knee injury ended his playing career.

Managerial career
Fischer became coach of Napoli at the start of the 1928–29 Divisione Nazionale, but was replaced during the season by Giovanni Terrile.

He coached Serbian side FK Mačva Šabac in the 1930–31 Yugoslav Championship.  He also coached DSV Saaz and HŠK Concordia.

Then he moved in 1936 to Latvia, where he coached Olimpia Liepaja. Under him, the team did not lose a game as they won the League in Fischer's first season, and again in 1938 and 1939.

He was killed in the Liepāja massacres, Latvia, in July 1941.

See also
List of select Jewish football (association; soccer) players

References

1901 births
1941 deaths
Footballers from Vienna
Austrian footballers
Austria international footballers
Austrian football managers
Austrian expatriate football managers
Association football forwards
First Vienna FC players
SC Hakoah Wien footballers
S.S.C. Napoli managers
Expatriate football managers in Czechoslovakia
Expatriate football managers in Italy
Expatriate football managers in Yugoslavia
Expatriate football managers in Latvia
Association football defenders
Jewish footballers
Austrian expatriate sportspeople in Czechoslovakia
Austrian expatriate sportspeople in Latvia
Austrian expatriate sportspeople in Yugoslavia
Austrian expatriate sportspeople in Italy
Austrian Jews who died in the Holocaust
Jewish Austrian sportspeople
Austrian people executed by Nazi Germany
People executed by Nazi Germany by firing squad